Wojciech Załuski (born 5 April 1960) is a Polish prelate of the Catholic Church who has worked in the diplomatic service of the Holy See since 1985. He has been an apostolic nuncio and an archbishop since 2014.

Biography 
He was born in Załuski-Lipniewo, in the center-east of Poland, on 5 April 1960. He earned a degree in canon law.

On 1 June 1985, he was ordained a priest for the Diocese of Łomza. He joined the diplomatic service of the Holy See on 1 July 1989 and filled assignments in Burundi, Malta, Albania, Zambia, Sri Lanka, Georgia, Ukraine, the Philippines, and Guatemala.

On 15 July 2014, Pope Francis named him apostolic nuncio to Burundi and titular archbishop of Diocletiana. He received his episcopal consecration on 9 August from Cardinal Pietro Parolin, Secretary of State.

On 29 September 2020, Pope Francis appointed him Apostolic Nuncio to Malaysia and to East Timor as well as Apostolic Delegate to Brunei.

See also
 List of heads of the diplomatic missions of the Holy See

References

External links
 Catholic Hierarchy: Archbishop Wojciech Załuski 

1960 births
Living people
People from Ostrów Mazowiecka County
Apostolic Nuncios to Burundi
Apostolic Nuncios to Malaysia
Apostolic Nuncios to East Timor
Pontifical Ecclesiastical Academy alumni
Diplomats of the Holy See